"Wardance" is a song by English post-punk band Killing Joke. It was released in February 1980 by Malicious Damage as the band's first single. The song was re-recorded for their self-titled debut album. The song has been performed at most of their live shows.

Release 

"Wardance" was released on 7" vinyl by Malicious Damage. A small number of copies from the original pressing came with a pre-typed form of military 'call-up papers' to be filled out and submitted by the purchaser. The B-side, "Pssyche", was commonly played live.

The single did not chart in the UK but reached number 50 in the US Billboard Dance Music/Club Play singles chart.

Cover versions 

In 1993, Econoline Crush covered "Pssyche" for their Purge EP, and in 2004, Nouvelle Vague covered it on their self-titled debut album. In 2001, Mad Capsule Markets covered "Wardance" on their album 010.

Track listing 

 Side A

 "Wardance" – 3:40

 Side B

 "Pssyche" – 5:02

Charts

See also
 List of anti-war songs

References 

1980 songs
Killing Joke songs
Songs written by Jaz Coleman
Songs written by Paul Ferguson
Songs written by Geordie Walker
Songs about dancing
Songs written by Youth (musician)